Dame Daphne du Maurier, Lady Browning,  (13 May 1907 – 19 April 1989) was an English novelist, biographer and playwright. Her parents were actor-manager Sir Gerald du Maurier and his wife, actress Muriel Beaumont. Her grandfather was George du Maurier, a writer and cartoonist.

Although du Maurier is classed as a romantic novelist, her stories have been described as "moody and resonant" with overtones of the paranormal. Her bestselling works were not at first taken seriously by critics, but they have since earned an enduring reputation for narrative craft. Many have been successfully adapted into films, including the novels Rebecca, Frenchman's Creek, My Cousin Rachel and Jamaica Inn, and the short stories "The Birds" and "Don't Look Now". Du Maurier spent much of her life in Cornwall, where most of her works are set. As her fame increased, she became more reclusive.

Biography

Early life

Daphne du Maurier was born at 24 Cumberland Terrace, Regent's Park, London, the middle of three daughters of prominent actor-manager Sir Gerald du Maurier and actress Muriel Beaumont. Her paternal grandfather was author and Punch cartoonist George du Maurier, who created the character of Svengali in the 1894 novel Trilby. Her paternal uncle Guy du Maurier was a playwright. Her mother was a paternal niece of journalist, author, and lecturer Comyns Beaumont. Her elder sister, Angela du Maurier, became an actress and later also a writer, and her younger sister Jeanne du Maurier was a painter. She was a cousin of the Llewelyn Davies boys, who were J. M. Barrie's inspiration for the characters in the play Peter Pan; or, The Boy Who Wouldn't Grow Up.

As a young child, du Maurier met many prominent theatre actors, because of the celebrity of her father. On meeting Tallulah Bankhead, du Maurier was quoted as saying that Bankhead was the most beautiful creature she had ever seen.

Du Maurier spent her childhood at Cannon Hall, Hampstead, the family's London residence, and summers at their home in Fowey, Cornwall, where they also lived during the war years.

Personal life

Du Maurier married Major (later Lieutenant-General) Frederick "Boy" Browning in 1932. They had three children:
 Tessa (b. 1933), who married Major Peter de Zulueta. After they divorced, she married David Montgomery, 2nd Viscount Montgomery of Alamein, in 1970.
 Flavia (b. 1937), who married Captain Alastair Tower. After they divorced, she married General Sir Peter Leng.
 Christian (b. 1940), a photographer and filmmaker. He married Olive White (Miss Ireland 1961).

Biographers have noted that du Maurier's marriage was at times somewhat chilly and that she could be aloof and distant to her children, especially the girls, when immersed in her writing. Her husband died in 1965 and soon after Daphne moved to Kilmarth, near Par, Cornwall, which became the setting for The House on the Strand.

Du Maurier has often been painted as a frostily private recluse who rarely mixed in society or gave interviews. An exception to this came after the release of the film A Bridge Too Far, in which her late husband was portrayed in a less-than-flattering light. Incensed, she wrote to the national newspapers, decrying what she considered unforgivable treatment. Once out of the public spotlight, however, many remembered her as a warm and immensely funny person who was a welcoming hostess to guests at Menabilly, the house which she had leased for many years (from the Rashleigh family) in Cornwall.

She appeared as a castaway in the BBC Radio programme Desert Island Discs broadcast on 3 September 1977. Her chosen book was The Collected Works of Jane Austen, and her luxury was whiskey and ginger ale.

Du Maurier was an early member of Mebyon Kernow, a Cornish nationalist party.

She was known as Daphne du Maurier from 1907 to 1932, when she married Frederick Browning. Still writing as Daphne du Maurier during her marriage, she was also known as Lady Browning after her husband was knighted in 1946. When she was made a Dame Commander of the Order of the British Empire in 1969, she was titled Dame Daphne du Maurier, Lady Browning, DBE, but she never used the title.

According to her biographer Margaret Forster, she told no one about the honour, so that even her children learned of it only from the newspapers. "She thought of pleading illness for the investiture, until her children insisted it would be a great day for the older grandchildren. So she went through with it, though she slipped out quietly afterwards to avoid the attention of the press."

Alleged relationships
After du Maurier's death in 1989, some writers speculated about her alleged relationships with a number of women, including the actress Gertrude Lawrence and Ellen Doubleday, the wife of her U.S. publisher Nelson Doubleday. Du Maurier stated in her memoirs that her father had wanted a son; being a tomboy, she wished to have been born a boy.

The Daphne du Maurier Companion, edited by Helen Taylor, includes Taylor's claims that du Maurier confessed to her in 1965 that she had had an incestuous relationship with her father and that he had been a violent alcoholic.

In correspondence that her family released to biographer Margaret Forster, du Maurier explained to a trusted few people her own unique slant on her sexuality: her personality comprised two distinct people – the loving wife and mother (the side she showed to the world); and the lover (a "decidedly male energy") hidden from virtually everyone and the power behind her artistic creativity. According to Forster's biography, du Maurier believed the "male energy" propelled her writing. Forster wrote that du Maurier's denial of her bisexuality unveiled a "homophobic" fear of her true nature.

The children of both du Maurier and Lawrence have objected strongly to the stories about their mothers' alleged intimate relationship. Two years after Lawrence died, a biography of her authored by her widower, Richard Aldrich, went into detail about a friendship between her and du Maurier that had begun in 1948 when Lawrence had accepted the lead role in du Maurier's new play September Tide. Aldrich said that Lawrence had toured Britain in the play in 1948 and continued with it in London's West End theatre district through 1949, and that later du Maurier visited them at their home in the United States. Aldrich made no mention of a possible same-sex relationship.

Death
Du Maurier died from heart failure in her sleep on 19 April 1989, aged 81, at her home in Par, Cornwall, which had been the setting for many of her books. Her body was cremated in private and without a memorial service (at her request) and her ashes scattered off the cliffs around Kilmarth and Menabilly, Cornwall.

Writing career

Novels, short stories, and biographies
Her family connections helped her establish her literary career, and she published some of her early work in her great uncle Comyns Beaumont's Bystander magazine. Her first novel, The Loving Spirit, was published in 1931.

The novel Rebecca (1938) was one of du Maurier's most successful works. It was an immediate hit, selling nearly 3 million copies between 1938 and 1965. The novel has never gone out of print. In the United States, du Maurier won the National Book Award for favourite novel of 1938 for the book, voted by members of the American Booksellers Association. In the UK, it was listed at number 14 of the "nation's best-loved novel"s on the BBC's 2003 survey The Big Read.

Other significant works include Jamaica Inn, Frenchman's Creek, Hungry Hill, My Cousin Rachel, The Scapegoat, The House on the Strand, and The King's General. The last is set in Cornwall during the English Civil War, and is written from the Royalist perspective. 

Du Maurier was often categorised as a "romantic novelist", a term that she deplored, given her novels rarely have a happy ending, and often have sinister overtones and shadows of the paranormal. In this light, she has more in common with the "sensation novels" of Wilkie Collins and others, which she admired. The critic Kate Kellaway wrote: "Du Maurier was mistress of calculated irresolution. She did not want to put her readers' minds at rest. She wanted her riddles to persist. She wanted the novels to continue to haunt us beyond their endings."

Du Maurier's novel Mary Anne (1954) is a fictionalised account of her great-great-grandmother, Mary Anne Clarke née Thompson (1776–1852), who, from 1803 to 1808, was mistress of Frederick Augustus, Duke of York and Albany (1763–1827). He was the "Grand Old Duke of York" of the nursery rhyme, a son of King George III, and brother of King George IV and King William IV. The central character of her last novel, Rule Britannia, is an aging actress, thought to be based on Gladys Cooper (to whom it is dedicated).

Du Maurier's short stories are darker: "The Birds", "Don't Look Now", "The Apple Tree", and "The Blue Lenses" are finely crafted tales of terror that shocked and surprised her audience in equal measure. As her biographer Margaret Forster wrote, "She satisfied all the questionable criteria of popular fiction, and yet satisfied too the exacting requirements of 'real literature'."

The discovery, in 2011, of a collection of du Maurier's forgotten short stories, written when the author was 21, provides some insight into her mature style. One of them, "The Doll", concerns a young woman's obsession with a mechanical male sex doll; it has been deemed by du Maurier's son Kit Browning to be "quite ahead of its time".

In later life, she wrote non-fiction, including several biographies such as Gerald, her father's biography. The Glass-Blowers traces her French Huguenot ancestry and vividly depicts the French Revolution. The du Mauriers traces the family's move from France to England in the 19th century.

The House on the Strand (1969) combines elements of "mental time-travel", a tragic love affair in 14th-century Cornwall, and the dangers of using mind-altering drugs. Her final novel, Rule Britannia (1972), satirises resentment that British people, Cornish people in particular, felt at increasing American involvement in UK affairs.

Film adaptations
Rebecca has been adapted for both stage and screen several times, most notably by Alfred Hitchcock in his 1940 film Rebecca. Several of du Maurier's other novels have also been adapted for the screen, including Jamaica Inn, Frenchman's Creek, Hungry Hill, and My Cousin Rachel in both 1952 and 2017. The Hitchcock film The Birds (1963) is based on a treatment of the short story of that name, as is the film Don't Look Now (1973). Of the films, du Maurier often complained that the only ones she liked were Hitchcock's Rebecca and Nicolas Roeg's Don't Look Now.

Hitchcock's treatment of Jamaica Inn was disavowed by both director and author, due to a complete re-write of the ending to accommodate the ego of its star, Charles Laughton. Du Maurier also felt that Olivia de Havilland was wrongly cast as the anti-heroine of My Cousin Rachel (1952). Frenchman's Creek fared better in a lavish Technicolor version released in 1944. Du Maurier later regretted her choice of Alec Guinness as the lead in the film of The Scapegoat, which she partly financed.

Playwright
Du Maurier wrote three plays. Her first was an adaptation of her novel Rebecca, which opened at the Queen's Theatre in London on 5 March 1940 in a production by George Devine, starring Celia Johnson and Owen Nares as the De Winters and Margaret Rutherford as Mrs. Danvers. After 181 performances, the production transferred to the Strand Theatre, with Jill Furse taking over as the second Mrs. De Winter and Mary Merrall as Mrs. Danvers, with a further run of 176 performances.

In 1943 she wrote the autobiographically inspired drama The Years Between about the unexpected return of a senior officer, thought killed in action, who finds that his wife has taken his seat as Member of Parliament (MP) and has started a romantic relationship with a local farmer. It was first staged at the Manchester Opera House in 1944 and then transferred to London, opening at Wyndham's Theatre on 10 January 1945, starring Nora Swinburne and Clive Brook. The production, directed by Irene Hentschel, became a long-running hit, completing 617 performances. It was revived by Caroline Smith at the Orange Tree Theatre in Richmond upon Thames on 5 September 2007, starring Karen Ascoe and Mark Tandy.

Her third play, September Tide, portrays a middle-aged woman whose bohemian artist son-in-law falls in love with her. Again directed by Irene Hentschel, it opened at the Aldwych Theatre on 15 December 1948 with Gertrude Lawrence as Stella. It closed in August 1949 after 267 performances.

Accusations of plagiarism
Shortly after Rebecca was published in Brazil, critic Álvaro Lins and other readers pointed out many resemblances to the 1934 book, A Sucessora (The Successor), by Brazilian writer Carolina Nabuco. According to Nabuco and her editor, not only the main plot, but also situations and entire dialogues had been copied. Du Maurier denied having copied Nabuco's book, as did her publisher, pointing out that the plot elements used in Rebecca said to have been plagiarised were quite common.

The controversy was examined in a 2002 article by Larry Rohter in The New York Times. According to Nabuco's memoirs, when the Hitchcock film Rebecca was first shown in Brazil, United Artists wanted Nabuco to sign a document stating that the similarities were merely a coincidence but she refused. Rohter quotes Nabuco's memoirs as saying, When the film version of 'Rebecca' came to Brazil, the producers' lawyer sought out my lawyer to ask him that I sign a document admitting the possibility of there having been a mere coincidence. I would be compensated with a quantity described as 'of considerable value.' I did not consent, naturally. Rohter remarked: "Nabuco had translated her novel into French and sent it to a publisher in Paris, who she learned was also Ms. du Maurier's [publisher] only after Rebecca became a worldwide success. The novels have identical plots and even some identical episodes."

Author Frank Baker believed that du Maurier had plagiarised his novel The Birds (1936) in her short story "The Birds" (1952). Du Maurier had been working as a reader for Baker's publisher Peter Llewelyn Davies at the time he submitted the book. When Hitchcock's The Birds was released in 1963, based on du Maurier's story, Baker considered, but was advised against, pursuing costly litigation against Universal Studios.

Cultural references
 The dialogue of Nikos Nikolaidis' 1987 film Morning Patrol contains excerpts of du Maurier's published works.
 Daphne du Maurier was one of five "Women of Achievement" selected for a set of British stamps issued in August 1996.
 English Heritage caused controversy in June 2008 by denying an application to commemorate her home in Hampstead with a Blue Plaque. In 2011 a plaque was mounted on Cannon Cottage in Well Street, Hampstead, put up by the Heath and Hampstead Society.
 In 2013, grandson Ned Browning released a collection of men's and women's watches based on characters from the novel Rebecca, under the brand name du Maurier Watches.
 In the 2014 novel The House at the End of Hope Street, du Maurier is featured as one of the women who has lived in the titular house.
 The character of Bedelia Du Maurier in the television series Hannibal was named in part after du Maurier because its creator Bryan Fuller is a fan of Alfred Hitchcock, who had adapted three of du Maurier's books to film.
 Daphne du Maurier appears as a character in the short story "The Housekeeper" by Rose Tremain. The story imagines a lesbian affair between du Maurier and a Polish housekeeper, who is then fictionalised as Mrs Danvers in Rebecca.

Publications

Fiction

Novels
 The Loving Spirit (1931)
 I'll Never Be Young Again (1932)
 The Progress of Julius (1933) (later re-published as Julius)
 Jamaica Inn (1936)
 Rebecca (1938)
 Frenchman's Creek (1941)
 Hungry Hill (1943)
 The King's General (1946)
 The Parasites (1949)
 My Cousin Rachel (1951)
 Mary Anne (1954)
 The Scapegoat (1957)
 Castle Dor (1961) (with Sir Arthur Quiller-Couch)
 The Glass-Blowers (1963)
 The Flight of the Falcon (1965)
 The House on the Strand (1969)
 Rule Britannia (1972)

Plays
 Rebecca (1940) (du Maurier's stage adaptation of her novel) 
 The Years Between (1945) (play)
 September Tide (1948) (play)

Short fiction
 Happy Christmas (1940) (short story)

Collected short fiction
 The Apple Tree (1952); entitled Kiss Me Again, Stranger (1953) in the US, with two additional stories; later republished as The Birds and Other Stories
 Early Stories (1959) (stories written between 1927 and 1930)
 The Breaking Point (1959) (AKA The Blue Lenses)
 The Birds and Other Stories (1963) (republication of The Apple Tree) 
 Not After Midnight (1971); published as Don't Look Now in the US and later also in the UK
 The Rendezvous and Other Stories (1980)
 Classics of the Macabre (1987) (anthology of earlier stories, illustrated by Michael Foreman, AKA Echoes from the Macabre: Selected Stories)
  Don't Look Now (2008) (new anthology published by New York Review Books)
  The Doll: The Lost Short Stories (2011) (early short stories)

Non-fiction
 Gerald: A Portrait (1934)
 The du Mauriers (1937)
 "A Writer Is a Strange Creature," The Writer, (November 1938)
 Come Wind, Come Weather (1940) (true stories of ordinary English people during the Second World War)
 The Young George du Maurier: a selection of his letters 1860–67 (1951)
 The Infernal World of Branwell Brontë (1960)
 Vanishing Cornwall (1967) (includes photographs by her son Christian)
 Golden Lads: Sir Francis Bacon, Anthony Bacon and their Friends (1975)
 The Winding Stair: Francis Bacon, His Rise and Fall (1976)
 Growing Pains – the Shaping of a Writer (1977) (a.k.a. Myself When Young – the Shaping of a Writer)
 The Rebecca Notebook and Other Memories (1983)
 Enchanted Cornwall (1989)

See also

 The Queen's Book of the Red Cross
 :Category:Novels by Daphne du Maurier
 Maroon beret – She was said to have chosen the colour which is now an international symbol of airborne forces, however in a letter, kept by the British Airborne Assault Archive, she wrote that it was untrue.

Notes

References

Further reading and other sources
 
 Obituary in The Independent, 21 April 1989
 Dictionary of National Biography. London, Oxford University Press, 1887– : Du Maurier, Dame Daphne (1907–1989); Browning, Sir Frederick Arthur Montague (1896–1965); Frederick, Prince, Duke of York and Albany (1763–1827); Clarke, Mary Anne (1776?–1852).
 Du Maurier, Daphne. Mary Anne. London: Gollancz, 1954.
 Du Maurier, Daphne. Enchanted Cornwall: Her Pictorial Memoir. London, Michael Joseph, 1989.
 Rance, Nicholas. "Not like Men in Books, Murdering Women: Daphne du Maurier and the Infernal World of Popular Fiction". In Clive Bloom (ed), Creepers: British Horror and Fantasy in the Twentieth Century. London and Boulder CO: Pluto Press, 1993. pp. 86–98.

External links

 
 Daphne du Maurier at the British Library
 1971 BBC TV interview (alternate link)
 Estate representation and published works
 dumaurier.org – extensive news and information site
 
 Daphne du Maurier at University of Exeter Special Collections

1907 births
1989 deaths
20th-century English women writers
20th-century English novelists
Anthony Award winners
British historical novelists
British women short story writers
Daphne
Dames Commander of the Order of the British Empire
Daphne
Edgar Award winners
English horror writers
English people of French descent
English short story writers
English women novelists
National Book Award winners
People involved in plagiarism controversies
Wives of knights
Women historical novelists
Women horror writers
Writers from London
Writers of Gothic fiction
Weird fiction writers